This event was held on Sunday 31 January 2010 as part of the 2010 UCI Cyclo-cross World Championships in Tábor, Czech Republic. The length of the course was 15.66 km (0.16 km + 5 laps of 3.10 km each).

Ranking

Notes

External links
 Union Cycliste Internationale
 

Women's elite race
UCI Cyclo-cross World Championships – Women's elite race
2010 in cyclo-cross